The Lincolnshire Senior County Cup is a football (soccer) competition for senior football clubs in Lincolnshire organised by the Lincolnshire FA.

The competition can be traced back to the formation of the Lincolnshire FA at a meeting held at the Queens Hotel in Lincoln on Saturday 17 September 1881 and sixteen teams entered the inaugural Lincolnshire Cup competition with Spilsby the first winners in 1881—82. Spilsby would go on to win the first three competitions and consequently they were allowed to retain the initial trophy.

When the competition first started it was treated as seriously as the FA Cup and the need for a Lincoln team to be successful in the competition following the initial victories by Spilsby, who defeated three Lincoln based teams – Lincoln Rovers, Lincoln Lindum and Lincoln Albion – in the 1883–84 competition, that led to the formation of Lincoln City on 26 June 1884.

The elevation of Grimsby Town and Lincoln City to the Football League in 1892 and Gainsborough Trinity in 1896 saw the importance of the competition decline over time and the format has undergone a number of changes over time as has the type of trophies offered by the Lincolnshire FA. In this entry attention is focused upon the most senior trophy offered by the Lincolnshire FA which currently has the official title of "The Lincolnshire Football Association Ltd Senior County Cup Competition" and is competed annually by the four senior clubs of the county: Boston United, Grimsby Town, Lincoln City and Scunthorpe United. The current holders are Cleethorpes Town.

The first competition, 1881–1934
The final was not played in the 1887–88 season after finalists Grimsby Town resigned from the Lincolnshire FA.

The second competition, 1934–1949
The increasing dominance of the county's two Football League sides Grimsby Town and Lincoln City saw the inauguration of the 'Lincolnshire Senior County Cup' which was played between the other Lincolnshire teams. The trophy was, by now, a minor consideration for the two clubs. For example, a crowd of just 2,334 gathered at Sincil Bank on 24 September 1934 to see Lincoln defeat Grimsby 5–0 compared to Lincoln's league average attendance of 5,227 for that season The competition was not held in either of the 1938–39 or 1939–40 seasons as the two clubs met in matches for the Football League Jubilee Fund, Lincoln coming out victorious in the first and Grimsby in the second. The senior non-league sides continued to play for the 'Lincolnshire County Senior Cup' (LCS) and this continued to attract strong interest for these sides with, for comparison, the 1934–35 final replay between Boston United and Grantham attracting an attendance of 5,500. The 'Lincolnshire County Junior Cup' continued for those clubs playing at a more junior non-league level.

In 1949–50, the final between Grimsby Town and Lincoln City was played at Grimsby on 13 May 1950, with Grimsby winning 2–1.

In 1951–52, the semi-final was between Scunthorpe United and Grimsby Town, played at Scunthorpe on 31 March 1952, with Scunthorpe winning 1–0, the goal scored by Whitfield. Lincoln City had a bye into the final. The final was played at Scunthorpe on 10 May 1952, with Scunthorpe winning 1–0, through an own goal by Emery.

In 1952–53, the semi-final was between Lincoln City and Grimsby Town, played at Lincoln on 15 April 1953, with Grimsby Town winning 3–0 with goals by Lord and Maddison (2). Scunthorpe United had a bye into the final. The final was played at Grimsby on 9 May 1953, with Grimsby Town winning 1–0 with a goal by Hernon.

Scunthorpe United beat Lincoln City in the 1953–54 semi-final, played at Lincoln. In the final, Scunthorpe United beat Grimsby Town 4–2.

In 1954–55, the semi-final was between Grimsby Town and Lincoln City at Grimsby on 19 October 1954, with an attendance of 3,918. Lincoln City won 2–0 with goals by Gibson and Finch. Scunthorpe United had a bye to the final. The 1954–55 final was played at Lincoln on 14 May 1955 with an attendance of 4,130. Scunthorpe United won 5–3, after extra time, with Scunthorpe United goals by Gregory (3), Brown and Whitfield. The Lincoln scorers were Garvie(2) and Munro.

The 1955–56 final was played at Scunthorpe United's ground on 12 May 1956. Score was 1–1.

Four team knock-out, 1956–1962
In 1956 the Lincolnshire Senior Cup competition was expanded to four clubs with the leading county non-league side, Boston United, invited to join the three league teams. In their first season in the competition they would defeat Grimsby Town in the semi-final before going on to lift the trophy with victory over Scunthorpe United in the final. Boston's demotion from the Southern Football League at the end of the 1960–61 season saw them replaced by Gainsborough Trinity for the 1961–62 competition.

In the 1956–57 season, Scunthorpe United beat Lincoln City at Scunthorpe on 1 October 1956 (or 15 October)in the first semi-final with a goal by Jones, and Boston United beat Grimsby Town 2–0 in the second semi-final with goals by Bloomer (2), on 16 October 1956. The final was played at Scunthorpe United's ground on 11 May 1957(or 10 May), with Boston United beating Scunthorpe United 3–1. Sharpe scored for Scunthorpe United, and the Boston goals were from Clarke, Dunn and Bushby (o.g.).

The next season, 1957–58, saw Grimsby Town beat Boston United 3–0 in the first semi-final on 8 October 1957, and Scunthorpe United beat Lincoln City in the other semi-final on 7 November 1957. In the final, Scunthorpe United beat Grimsby Town 3–2 on 5 May 1958.

In 1958–59, Lincoln City beat Boston United in the first semi-final on 29 September 1958 and Scunthorpe United beat Grimsby Town in the other semi-final on 9 October 1958. Scunthorpe United went on to beat Lincoln City in the final on 17 November 1958.

In 1959–60, Lincoln City beat Scunthorpe United in one semi-final and Boston United beat Grimsby Town 2–1 in the other semi-final played on 27 October 1959. Boston United went on to win the final, beating Lincoln City 2–1 on 24 November 1959.

Grimsby Town beat Lincoln City 8-3 in one of the 1960–61 semi-finals on 7 November 1960 and Scunthorpe United beat Boston United 3–1 in the other semi-final on 3 October 1960. In the final, Scunthorpe United beat Grimsby Town 4–0 on 6 March 1961.

Gainsborough Trinity's first appearance in the cup was a loss in the semi-final to Lincoln City in 1961–62. In the other semi-final, Scunthorpe United beat Grimsby Town on 17 October 1961. Lincoln City won the final, beating Scunthorpe United 2–0 on 19 March 1962.

The doldrum years, 1962–1968
This period was marked by a lack of interest in the trophy. The main competition was not held in either the 1962–63 season or the 1964–65 season. In two seasons of this period, the trophy was shared after the final failed to reach a conclusion. The Senior 'A' Cup was only played for once in this timeframe, Gainsborough Trinity defeating Boston United 2–1 in a replay on 15 April 1964.

In 1963–64, Scunthorpe United beat Grimsby Town in the first semi-final on 28 April 1964. In the final, held at Lincoln on 30 April 1964, the teams drew.

In 1965–66, Lincoln City reached the final after a 1–1 draw with Grimsby Town, at Lincoln, on 29 March 1966. Scunthorpe United received a bye to reach the final. The final, played at Scunthorpe on 24 May 1966 was a draw.

In 1966–67, Scunthorpe United beat Grimsby Town 3–2 at Grimsby on 7 November 1966 in the first semi-final. In the final, played week commencing 11 February 1967 at Lincoln, Lincoln City beat Scunthorpe United.

In 1967–68, Lincoln City played Scunthorpe United in the first semi-final on 14 February 1968. Grimsby Town went on to win the cup.

Six team knock-out, 1968–1976
The Northern Premier League was founded in 1968 with Boston United and Gainsborough Trinity as founder members. At the same time they, along with Grantham, joined the three existing league clubs to form a six team knock-out competition played from the Quarter Final stage with two teams receiving a bye into the Semi Finals. The second tier of non-league sides competed for the Lincolnshire Senior 'A' Cup with the minor, mainly Lincolnshire league sides competing for the Lincolnshire Senior 'B' Cup.

In 1968–69, Grantham Town and Scunthorpe United drew the first quarter-final at Grantham in October 1968. The replay was held in Scunthorpe on 10 May 1969, with Scunthorpe winning. The second quarter-final between Lincoln City and Grimsby Town needed three attempts to obtain a result, with Lincoln finally winning. The first semi-final was between Boston United and Scunthorpe United at Boston on 24 April 1969, ending in a 1–1 draw. Boston United then withdrew as they were not prepared to visit Scunthorpe after 2 May 1969, and as Scunthorpe had two Fourth Division games already arranged for the week prior, this could not be agreed. In the second semi-final, Lincoln City beat Gainsborough Trinity on 28 April 1969. In the final, Lincoln City beat Scunthorpe United on 3 May 1969 at Lincoln.

In 1969–70, Lincoln City reached the final by beating Grantham 5–1 away and Gainsborough Trinity 3–0 at home after a 3–3 draw away. Boston United reached the final by beating Scunthorpe United 5–3 in the semi-final at Scunthorpe. Lincoln City went on to win the final, played on 4 May 1970 at Boston.

League versus non-League groups, 1976–1983
For the competitions in the seasons between 1976–77 and 1982–83, the three league teams (Grimsby Town, Lincoln City and Scunthorpe United) were placed in one group with the three senior non-league teams (Boston United, Gainsborough Trinity and Grantham) in another. Each group member played the other members once with the two group winners meeting in the final.

Mixed formats, 1983–1986
The 1983–84 competition was played as a straight knock-out between the six competing clubs, the league sides Grimsby Town, Lincoln City and Scunthorpe United and the three senior non-league sides Boston United, Gainsborough Trinity and Grantham. The 1984–85 and 1985–86 competitions reverted to a group format, with two randomly drawn groups of three with the winners progressing to the final.

Straight knock-out, 1986–1996
The competition was played as a straight knock-out. The three league sides Grimsby Town, Lincoln City and Scunthorpe United competed as did the three senior non-league sides Boston United, Gainsborough Trinity and Grantham Town (except 1992–93). Spalding United's seasons in the Southern Football League saw them compete in the competition from 1989 to 1991. The 1995–96 competition reverted to a group format, with two randomly chosen groups of three with the winners of each group progressing to the final.

Increasing numbers, 1996–2003

Lincoln United's rise up the non-league pyramid saw them enter the competition in 1996–97 (they won the Lincolnshire Senior 'A' Cup in 1995–96). Scunthorpe United ended Grimsby Town's five-year reign as champions, defeating them 5–4 on penalties in the 1996–97 final. Lincoln City did not enter the 1999–2000 competition. Stamford promotion to the Southern Football League Eastern Division saw them eligible for the competition and their victory in the 2000–01 competition meant they became the first club to lift four types of Lincolnshire Cup: the Junior Cup (in 1948–49), Senior 'B' Cup (1951–52, 1953–54) and Senior 'A' Cup (1978–79, 1982–83, 1997–98).

More changes, (2003–2012)
From 2003 to 2004 onwards, following Boston United's promotion to the Football league, the Lincolnshire Senior County Cup has been competed for by Boston United, Grimsby Town, Lincoln City and Scunthorpe United and organised as a knock-out competition. Teams in levels 5–8 of the English football league system compete for the Lincolnshire Senior Shield while those in levels 9–11 compete in the Lincolnshire County Senior Trophy. As the draw for the 2007–08 Senior Cup was made before Boston United's double relegation they remained in this competition where they were knocked out by eventual winners Scunthorpe United. The 2008–09 competition was reduced to just the three Football League sides with Grimsby Town defeating Lincoln City in a semi-final tie before losing to Scunthorpe United in the final. The 2009–10 saw just three Football League sides again with Scunthorpe United defeating Grimsby Town in the semi-final 3–0 before defeating Lincoln City on penalties 4–2 after a 1–1 draw.  In 2010–11, Grimsby beat Lincoln 4–2 at Blundell Park before losing at Scunthorpe 4–3 on penalties after a 1–1 draw.

Extended competition (2013–2015)
At the beginning of the 2013–14 campaign, the changed to being played by Lincolnshire's top five sides, Scunthorpe United, Grimsby Town, Lincoln City, Gainsborough Trinity and Boston United. Boston and Gainsborough would compete for a place in the semi-final while the other three sides would automatically be entered with the winner of that match. However the final despite always being a traditional pre-season event was now moved to October, with the semi-finals taking part in early August. The switch in date for the final meant that the sides began fielding a mixed team of youth and first team players as not to interrupt their domestic campaigns.

Further extended competition (2015–)
At a meeting of member clubs in April 2015, it was agreed that the format for the competition would be extended to enable ten of the county's most senior clubs to play in a revised structure. Professional sides Grimsby Town, Lincoln City and Scunthorpe United have since begun to field their youth teams in the tournament which has seen the Non-League teams begin to dominate the finals.

Past winners
The table summarises the winners of the Lincolnshire Senior County Cup (1934–) and its previous names (1881–1934). For the clubs in this category, victories in the lower level competitions are also summarised.

See also
Lincolnshire derby

References

Boston United Season by Season Records
Grantham Town Season by Season Records
Scunthorpe United Club Honours

Football in Lincolnshire
County Cup competitions